Grzegorz Kasprzik (born 20 September 1983 in Pyskowice) is a Polish footballer who currently plays for GKS Dąb Gaszowice. He also holds German citizenship.

Career
Kasprzik began his career with Górnik Zabrze. Later he played for youth teams of Hamburger SV. In 2005, after playing for Górnik Zabrze reserves Kasprzik was signed with Przyszłość Ciochowice and two years later he joined Piast Gliwice. In 2009, he became a Lech Poznań player.

In the summer 2019, Kasprzik joined GKS Dąb Gaszowice.

Personal life
Kasprzik's younger brother, Tomasz is also goalkeeper.

References

External links
 
 

1983 births
Living people
People from Pyskowice
Polish footballers
Association football goalkeepers
Lech Poznań players
Piast Gliwice players
Flota Świnoujście players
Bruk-Bet Termalica Nieciecza players
Górnik Zabrze players
Ruch Radzionków players
Ekstraklasa players
I liga players
Sportspeople from Silesian Voivodeship